The Knights of Pendragon is a superhero team appearing in American comic books published by Marvel Comics. The team was published by the imprint Marvel UK in a self-titled comic from 1990 to 1993, and in the anthology title Overkill. It was written by Dan Abnett and John Tomlinson with art by Gary Erskine. Pendragon is an alternate name for King Arthur.

Publication history
The comic was created during a period of attempted expansion by Marvel UK, trying to build on the critical success of Captain Britain.

Knights of Pendragon was initially a highly political and environmental comic, its themes borrowing heavily from British folklore and the growing New Age and neopagan subcultures. The comic was even printed on Scangloss, which is an environmentally friendly paper using half the trees and minimum whitening bleach.

Later issues dropped or downplayed these elements and the series became a more standard superhero title.

The series initially met with a positive critical reaction and strong sales, but sales declined as the series went on. It was cancelled with issue #18.

Skip Dietz and Hoang Nguyen featured the team in Marvel Comics Presents #122 (February 1993); the story is about an investigation into the cause of crop circles.

John Freeman pitched a follow-up called Armageddon Knights in late 1993, but never received a response; the story, which featured Grace and Union Jack, would have wrapped up loose-ends from the preceding series.

Synopsis

The team is formed to be agents of the Green Knight (from Sir Gawain and the Green Knight), who is portrayed as an aspect of the Green Man; a mystical entity representing the natural cycle and spiritual growth. The Knight is in ageless conflict with the Bane, an unnatural destructive force of warfare and winter, apparently led by the Red Knight, the Green Knight's adversary. The Green Knight invests power, in the form of a possessing spirit bestowing powers, to various groups throughout British history, to protect nature; one such group were the original Knights of the Round Table; the Knights of Pendragon are a modern-day incarnation.

First volume
Dai Thomas, a supporting character from the Captain Britain strip and burnt-out Scotland Yard Inspector, is assigned to solve a series of gruesome murders of ecologically-based criminals (corrupt farmers, ivory hunters, exotic bird smugglers, and so on). Accompanied by satellite reporter Kate McClellan, Thomas becomes obsessed with fighting the criminals themselves, and after a series of visions, becomes superhumanly strong and battle-savvy.

Captain Britain is sent by the British Government to retrieve the apparently insane Thomas from a cut-down section of the Amazon Rainforest, they instead fight, and Britain kills Thomas. It becomes apparent that Thomas and the Captain are possessed by the spirit of Gawain and Lancelot respectively from the time of King Arthur. The Captain was destined to kill Thomas in accordance to Arthurian lore. He is then resurrected.

The three of them travel to the Green Knight's citadel, whilst Thomas/Gawain recounts the Green Knight's poem. The comic's interpretation of the beheading-themed poem is as an ecological metaphor, a pact between man and nature:

 'A bargain between man and the great wild force that should stand forever, that neither should take more than he can give back...destroy more than he can replace...strike deep, and refuse to accept a blow in return."

Man had forgotten that pact, and so the Knight was lashing out in pain. Gawain sacrifices his Pendragon power to partially heal the Knight, and also to spark the creation of another Pendragon group.

Later appearances
The Green Knight and the Pendragon Force briefly appeared in the later Captain Britain and MI13 series, when the alien Skrulls invaded Avalon (as part of the "Secret Invasion" event). The Green Knight was decapitated by a Super-Skrull and the Pendragon Force was briefly controlled by the Skrulls and redistributed to empower the Skrull soldiers attacking London. With the failure of their invasion, the Green Knight was restored and the Skrulls lost control of the Pendragon Force.

In 2014's Revolutionary War, the Pendragons were shown as part of the final battle against Mys-Tech. Years later, Dai, Kate, Union Jack, an elderly Albion, and new ally Pete Wisdom united to stop Omni-Corporation from digging up an old Mys-Tech base in the Lake District. The base contained perverted zombie clones of the original Round Table (complete with "Zombie Excalibur") who wanted to slaughter and return Britain to a distorted Dark Ages, and sent a defeated Albion to Psycho-Wraith Prime. Wisdom turned the tide by reawakening the Green Knight in a new form, representing the best of modern Britain (deliberately resembling Mo Farah). Albion was used as part of a portal to bring Mephisto's Hell to Earth but the Knights helped stop it. Afterwards, the team disbanded again.

Characters

The team, a mix of everyday people and superheroes, consisted mostly of new characters, with the exception of Union Jack. Each member was the modern day version of an Arthurian knight, and was possessed by the same ancient spirit that had possessed that knight. The Green Knight gave each of them powers, including heightened senses and fighting skill, the ability to speak with animals, and the ability to shoot blasts of "Pendragon fire".

The full roster was:
Albion (Peter Hunter): A history teacher who has had the power of Albion since World War I. He has battled the Bane throughout the years. He currently equates to Merlin, although the spirit that originally possessed him was that of Herne the Hunter. The leader of the group, he represents the Green Knight's aspects of intellect and wisdom.
Adam Crown: A young man whose Pendragon power was awoken by the team breaking up, he reunited the team and led it in battle against the Bane's forces. He possessed the spirit of King Arthur.
Ben Gallagher: A writer with an obsession concerning the Holy Grail, Gallagher equated to Percival. He embodies the Green Knight's spiritual and sensitive aspects.
Francesca Lexley Grace: An agent of the Bane reformed by Adam, she became a Pendragon, possessed by the spirit of Morgause.
Breeze James: A reporter hired by the malevolent technomagical company Mys-Tech to learn about the Pendragons, she became the new Guenevere after Kate McClellan left the team.
Kate McClellan: A reporter who was investigating a series of "eco-terrorist" attacks which turned out to be the work of the Green Man, she became the equivalent of Guinevere. Her son, Cam, was also a Pendragon, briefly possessing the spirit of Merlin, before Hunter reclaimed it.
Sir Gawain: A robot from an Arthurian theme park, possessed by the spirit of Gawain, which had left its intended host.
Union Jack (Joseph Chapman): The third hero to call himself Union Jack (the first was a World War I period character created by Roy Thomas, the second was his son), he equated to Lancelot.

Not all Pendragons were members of the team. Captain Britain was briefly Lancelot, and his police contact Inspector Dai Thomas was possessed by the spirit of Gawain before the robot. It was also suggested that Iron Man and Black Panther were unawakened Pendragons, having the spirits of Bedevere and Robin Hood respectively. It is not known if the Black Knight's current title of Pendragon is connected to the team.

Collected editions

References

Knights of Pendragon at the Appendix to the Handbook of the Marvel Universe
Knights of Pendragon at the International Catalogue of Superheroes
Knights of Pendragon at the Marvel Directory

Knights of Pendragon at the Big Comic Book Database

Knights of Pendragon (1990) at the Unofficial Handbook of Marvel Comics Creators
Pendragon/Knights of Pendragon (1992) at the Unofficial Handbook of Marvel Comics Creators

External links
Review at Camelot in 4 Colors

Marvel Comics superhero teams
Arthurian characters
Arthurian comics
Comics by Dan Abnett